Romanisation of Assamese is the representation of the Assamese language in the Latin script. Various ways of romanisation systems of Assamese are used.

See also
Roman Urdu

Assamese language
Romanization